Alto Sano may refer to:

Places
Alto Sano, Las Marías, Puerto Rico, a barrio
Alto Sano, San Sebastián, Puerto Rico, a barrio